Nuvraj Singh Bassi (born March 20, 1983) is a former defensive tackle in the Canadian Football League. He was drafted 43rd overall in the 2010 CFL Draft by the Lions. He played college football for the Oregon Ducks.

He previously played for the Saskatchewan Roughriders and Montreal Alouettes.

Professional career
Nuvraj was drafted by the BC Lions in the fifth round (43rd overall) in the 2005 CFL Draft and spent the year on the team's practice roster. He did not re-sign with the Lions for the 2006 season and spent two years out of football. He signed with the Saskatchewan Roughriders in 2008 and was on their practice roster for two years, alternating between the offensive line and defensive line. After his release from by the Roughriders, he signed with the Montreal Alouettes for the 2010 season. He was signed to the Lions' practice roster in July 2011. He was released by the Lions on October 25, 2011.

Personal life
Bassi's parents are Kalvinder and Inderjit Bassi, and he has one brother and one sister. Nuvraj comes from a sports family, and they were very supportive of their son’s prospects.

Nuvraj Bassi made history as the first Sikh in the Canadian Football League (CFL), when he made his June CFL debut as a member of the Grey Cup Champion Saskatchewan Roughriders.

References

1983 births
Living people
Canadian football defensive linemen
Canadian Sikhs
Montreal Alouettes players
Oregon Ducks football players
Canadian football people from Vancouver
Players of Canadian football from British Columbia
Canadian people of Indian descent